Vento del sud also known as South Wind is a 1959 Italian mafia crime thriller film directed by Enzo Provenzale starring Claudia Cardinale and Renato Salvatori.

Cast
Renato Salvatori ...  Antonio Spagara
Claudia Cardinale ...  Grazia Macri
Rossella Falk ...  Deodata Macri
Laura Adani ...  The baroness
Giuseppe Cirino ...  Luigino
Salvatore Fazio ...  The knight
Ivo Garrani ...  The mafia godfather
Annibale Ninchi ...  Marquis Macri
Sara Simoni ...  The landlady
Franco Volpi...  Guido Lo Gozzo

External links
 

1959 films
1950s Italian-language films
Films about the Sicilian Mafia
1950s crime thriller films
Italian black-and-white films
Italian crime thriller films
Lux Film films
1950s Italian films